Cyrtodactylus redimiculus, also known as the Palawan bow-fingered gecko or Palawan bent-toed gecko, is a species of gecko that is endemic to Palawan in the Philippines.

References 

Cyrtodactylus
Reptiles described in 1962